Constance Edith Fowler (1907–1996) was an American artist known as a painter and printmaker, an author, and an educator who taught at Willamette University and Albion College.

Early life and education
Constance Edith Fowler was born June 2, 1907, in International Falls, Minnesota. She was the daughter of immigrants George Fowler, a butcher from England, and Matilda Einfeld (Braaker) Fowler, from Hamburg. The family lived in Aitken, Cuyuna, and Crosby, Minnesota, before moving to Pullman, Washington, in 1923, where she finished high school. She earned an A.B. at Washington State College in 1929, studying with the painter William McDermitt. She also studied for three terms at the University of Washington before moving to California, and later to Salem, Oregon in 1932. She enrolled during five summers at the University of Oregon, where she was supported by three summer Carnegie grants; she studied there with Walter R. B. Willcox and Andrew Vincent, earning an M.F.A. in 1940.

Career 
In Salem during the depression, she gave art lessons for a dollar per session, and volunteered to run an art club for Willamette University students. In 1935 Fowler "became a founding faculty member of Willamette University’s art department". She taught art at Willamette University from 1935 to 1947, and from 1949 to 1956, she taught summer classes at Central Washington State and Bayview Summer College in Michigan. Fowler taught at Albion College in Michigan from 1947 until her retirement to Seal Rock, Oregon, in 1965, where she continued to exhibit locally. Afte a stroke in 1993, she lived in Milwaukie, Oregon, with her sister, and then went to a nursing home in Oregon City. She died in 1996.

Critical reception
Critics have observed that Constance Fowler's works range from representational or expressive realism to abstract. Fowler published a limited edition of her master's thesis, which included twenty wood engravings of Willamette Valley historic sites and explanatory text, entitled The Old Days, In and Near Salem, Oregon. When it was displayed at the Salem library, the library staff wrote,

The Capitol Journal of Salem said, "The pioneer period of our native state is graphically presented in the twenty wood engravings of historic spots around Salem done by Constance Fowler... Miss Fowler has been accorded recognition as one of the northwest's outstanding artists. She is an annual exhibitor in the northwest and Pacific coast galleries. One of her pictures was selected a prize to the state, winning first place in National Art Week in 1940."

Biographer Roger Hull has said of Fowler's move to Michigan, "Leaving Oregon in 1947 was a major step at a crucial moment in the cultural history of the United States, with World War II at an end and younger artists questioning the values of American Regionalism and realism."

In another analysis, Hull wrote,

Commenting in 1957, that "Her recent work, now on display at the Bush Museum, will no doubt surprise many of these admirers, both for the new aesthetic approaches and the new concepts that motivate this work", Carl Hall explored differences in her later woks that are "very contemporary in her concern for the abstract consequence", with "this atomic age the great impersonal forces at work in the universe have to be taken into account" and the "human frailty with which we confront them". Hall continued,

Roger Hull reported she was aware of perplexing some of her viewers, and she "wrote with a note of ruefulness", that "The term 'abstract' causes many mortals to barricade the windows of their minds and reach for the aspirin." In 1996 Hull wrote, "she was rightly recognized as an artist genuinely expressive of the mood and poetry of the Northwest. More than most others, she sensed and expressed the turbulence and darkness of nature, as well."

Selected exhibitions
Fowler's works are held in the permanent collections of Portland Art Museum, Willamette University, and Washington State University Library. Her works have been exhibited at the Seattle Art Museum and the New York World’s Fair in 1939. Her work was in San Francisco Museum of Art’s "Oregon Artists" exhibition. In 1949, she held a one-person show at the Memorial Auditorium in Indianapolis, and in 1968 she exhibited at the Willamette University Gallery.

Publications

Awards
 William G. Purcell prize, best work in Oregon Society of Artists spring exhibition, 1934
 Carnegie grants, summers, 1936 through 1938
 First place, National Art Week, 1940
 Katherine B. Baker Memorial Purchase prize, 28th annual exhibition of northwest artisls, Seattle Art Museum, 1942.
 Willamette University award, 1991

See also
 List of 20th-century women artists
 List of American artists 1900 and after
 List of printmakers
 Expressionism
 Modern art
 Western painting

References

External links
 Constance Fowler Collection, Willamette University
  (video, 4:46 minutes)

1907 births
1996 deaths
20th-century American printmakers
20th-century American women artists
Albion College faculty
American women printmakers
Artists from Minnesota
Artists from Oregon
Artists from Washington (state)
Educators from Michigan
Educators from Minnesota
Educators from Oregon
Educators from Washington (state)
Modern printmakers
People from International Falls, Minnesota
University of Oregon alumni
University of Washington alumni
Washington State University alumni
University of Oregon faculty
Willamette University faculty
American women academics